Senator Williamson may refer to:

Ben M. Williamson (1864–1941), U.S. Senator from Kentucky from 1930 to 1931
George A. Williamson (born 1938), Florida State Senate
James Allen Williamson (born 1951), Oklahoma State Senate
John N. Williamson (1855–1943), Oregon State Senate
Joseph Williamson (Maine politician) (1789–1854), Maine State Senate
Norris C. Williamson (1874–1949), Louisiana State Senate
Pliny W. Williamson (1876–1958), New York State Senate
Robert McAlpin Williamson (1804–1859), Republic of Texas Senate and Texas State Senate
Rollin S. Williamson (1839–1889), Illinois State Senate
William D. Williamson (1779–1846), Massachusetts State Senate